Asterope (  or Στεροπή, Asteropē or Steropē, "lightning") was a Hesperid in Greek mythology.

Parents and names 
Asterope's parents, along with her sisters, were sometimes daughters of Nyx and Erebus, sometimes of Atlas, even Zeus in some cases. Other possible parents were Phorcys and Ceto, and Hesperus. Her sisters were Chrysothemis, Hygieia and Lipara.

Literally, her name means "Starry-Faced"., a compound of ἄστηρ (ástēr, "star") and ὄψ (ops, "face"), but its idiomatic meaning is "lightning". She also has another name she sometimes uses: Hesperia, which is probably linked to one of her putative parents.

Namesake 
Asterope is a genus of butterflies of the family Nymphalidae.

Notes

Nymphs

Hesperides